All competitive handball in Scotland is sanctioned and organised by the Scottish Handball Association.

Points system

For this season a new points system has been adopted for both the men's and women's leagues:

3 Points for a Win
2 Points for a Draw
1 Point for a Defeat by 10 goals or less
0 Points for a Defeat greater than 10 goals

Venues

Blackburn Community Centre, West Lothian Directions

Will host Men's and Ladies League Games as well as the 1st Round of the Scottish Cup

Ravnescraig Leisure Centre, Motherwell Directions

Will host Men's League Games, The Scottish Cup Finals and one round of the Ladies League

Strathclyde University Sports Centre, Glasgow Directions

Will host one round of the Men's League

Men's League 2010/11

This season six teams will compete for the League Title:

 Dumfries Handball Club
 EK82 Handball Club
 Gracemount Handball Club
 Glasgow Handball Club
 Liberton handball Club
 Tryst 77 Handball Club

Men's League fixtures

Week One

16/10/2010 @ Blackburn

http://issuu.com/britishhandball/docs/handball_news__oct_20_2010

Week Two

23/10/2010 @ Ravenscraig

 Liberton lost by less than 10 Goals, 1 bonus point awarded.
http://issuu.com/britishhandball/docs/handball_news__oct_27_2010

Week Three

20/11/2010 @ Ravenscraig

Week Four

13/02/2011 @ Blackburn

Week Five

11/12/2010 @ Strathclyde University

Week Six

22/01/2011 @ Ravenscraig

Week Seven

05/02/2011 @ Blackburn

Week Eight

05/03/2011 @ Blackburn

Week Nine

19/03/2011 @ Tryst

Week Ten

17/04/2011 @ tba

Men's League table 2010/11

Men's League statistics

The following statistics for the Scottish Handball League are up to and including week 10:

Top goalscorers

Ladies' League 2010/11

This Season Four teams will compete for the Ladies League Title:

 East Kilbride 82 Ladies Handball Club
 Edinburgh Ladies Handball Club
 Glasgow Ladies Handball Club
 Tryst 77 Ladies Handball Club

Ladies' League fixtures 2010/11

Week One

09/10/2010

Week Two

16/10/2010

 EK82 Ladies lost by less than 10 goals, 1 bonus point awarded

Week Three

06/11/2010

Week Four

13/11/2010

Week Five

12/12/2010

Week Six

08/01/2011

Week Seven

15/01/2011

Week Eight

05/02/2011

Week Nine

12/02/2011

Week Ten

05/03/2011

Week Eleven

12/03/2011

Week Twelve

02/04/2011

Ladies' League table 2010/11

Ladies' League statistics

The following statistics for the Scottish Handball League are up to and including week 0:

Top goalscorers

Club disciplinary records

Scottish Cup

Fixtures will be posted when the draw has been made

1st Round

02/04/2011 @ Blackburn from 1:15pm

Semi-finals

07/05/2011 Venue and time to be confirmed

Final

21/05/2011 @ Ravenscraig time to be confirmed

External links
 Official site

Handball competitions in Scotland
Hand
Hand